The Poker Club is a 2008 American thriller film. It was directed by Tim McCann.

Premise
Four friends accidentally kill a burglar during their weekly poker night.

Cast
Loren Dean as Curtis Wilcox 
Lori Heuring as Jan Tyler
Johnny Messner as Bill Doyle
Judy Reyes as Detective Patterson
Johnathon Schaech as Aaron Tyler
Jana Kramer as Trudy Todaro

References

External links

American thriller films
2008 films
2008 thriller films
Films directed by Tim McCann
2000s English-language films
2000s American films